Changfu Temple is a Taoist temple along Sanxia Old Street in Sanxia District, New Taipei, Taiwan. Master Qingshui, known locally as Zushi-Gong, is the principal deity worshiped at Changfu Temple.

History
Changfu Temple was first built during the Qing dynasty in 1767 by Hokkien immigrants from Anxi County, Quanzhou Municipality, Fujian Province, in China. It has been reconstructed three times. Its last reconstruction, started in 1947, is best known for being the masterpiece of renowned Taiwanese artist, Li Meishu.

Festivals
Every sixth day of the first month of the Chinese lunar calendar on Zushi-Gong's birthday, Changfu Temple holds a sacred pig (神豬) contest. Farmers would compete by raising the largest pig, which during the competition day, the pig is decorated with ornaments. The largest pig will then be sacrificed to the mountain deities, then the meat will be distributed among the devotees. In the past few years, this tradition has been met with objection by animal rights activists. While the majority of temples that practice this rite have started using symbolic pigs, Changfu Temple in Sanxia still continues the tradition of using an actual pig.

Architecture
Unique among temples, all of the walls and columns of Changfu Temple are sculpted from stone. The details are also carved with a wide variety of styles from ancient to modern, or even western-influenced, due to the western art education of Li Meishu.

Transportation
The temple is accessible south of Yingge Station of Taiwan Railways.

See also
 Master Qingshui
 Bangka Qingshui Temple (艋舺清水巖), Taipei, Taiwan
 Zhouzi Qingshui Temple (清水宮), Kaohsiung, Taiwan
 Chin Swee Caves Temple (清水岩庙), Genting Highlands, Malaysia
 Snake Temple Penang, Malaysia
 Fushan Temple (福山寺), Yangon, Myanmar
 List of temples in Taiwan
 Religion in Taiwan

Gallery

External links

The Art of Changufu Temple
Photographs of Changufu Temple on Flickr

1767 establishments in Taiwan
Religious buildings and structures completed in 1947
Taoist temples in Taiwan
Temples in New Taipei